QBlade is a public source, cross-platform simulation software for wind turbine blade design and aerodynamic simulation. It comes with a user-friendly graphical user interface (GUI) based on Qt.

Overview
QBlade is a public source wind turbine calculation software, distributed under the Academic Public License. The software is seamlessly integrated into XFOIL, an airfoil design and analysis tool. The purpose of this software is the design and aerodynamic simulation of wind turbine blades. The integration in XFOIL allows for the user to rapidly design custom airfoils and compute their performance curves, Extrapolating the performance data to a range of 360°Angle of attack, and directly integrate them into a wind turbine rotor simulation. The graphical user interface, including a custom dnymaic graph class for data visualizations makes this software accessible to a large potential user community.

QBlade is especially adequate for teaching, as it provides a ’hands-on’ feeling for Horizontal-axis wind turbine (HAWT) rotor design and shows all the fundamental relationships between blade twist, blade chord, section airfoil performance, turbine control, power and load curves in an easy and intuitive way. QBlade also includes post processing of conducted rotor simulations and gives deep insight into all relevant blade and rotor variables.

Development History 
QBlade's development was started in 2009 at the Hermann Föttinger Institute of TU Berlin. The 1st online version, released in 2010, was received with positive remarks which led to the continuation of the development. 
After the integration of a turbulent wind field generator, a Vertical Axis Wind Turbine (VAWT) module and a structural Euler-Bernoulli beam module (QFEM) an updated version (v0.8) of the software was released on 9 May 2014. 
An updated stable version (v0.96) was released in August 2015. This included a new aerodynamic module which replaced the BEM of QBlade with a new advanced Lifting Line Theory (LLT) module. Furthermore, a Free Wake Vortex model was implemented for the accurate representation of the near and far wake of the turbine.
A new version of QBlade was released in August 2022. QBlade Community Edition (QBlade-CE 2.0.4) includes all functionality that is required for the aero-servo-hydro-elastic simulation of wind turbines. For the structural dynamics modelling QBlade integrates the Project Chrono multi-physics library.

Functionality 

The functionality of QBlade includes the following features:

 Airfoil generation and modification
 Polar generation and extrapolation
 Rotor design (HAWT and VAWT) including active elements (such as flaps) and damaged blade stations
 Propeller design
 Steady state BEM analysis, fully parallelized parametric BEM
 Structural turbine definition powered by Project Chrono
 Cable elements to model blade cables, guy wires or mooring lines.
 Custom substructure definition (monopile, jacket, floaters)
 Seamless integration of NREL’s TurbSim for turbulent windfield generation
 Linear wave generator (regular, irregular, custom and pre-defined spectra
 Controller Integration (Bladed style, DTU style, TUB style)
 Aero-servo-hydro-elastic wind turbine simulations
 Streamlined ASCII based import / export functionality for all objects in QBlade
 IEC compliant DLC pre-processor
 Multi turbine simulation
 Multi rotor turbine definition
 Full parallelization of aero-hydro-elastic simulations
 Command line interface
 Software in loop interface
 Modal analysis capabilities

License 
QBlade is distributed under the Academic Public License. It is maintained and continuously developed at the Hermann Föttinger Institute of TU Berlin (Chair of Fluid Dynamics) and at QBlade.org.

Validation 
QBlade has been successfully validated against the WT_Perf Blade Element Momentum Theory code of NWTC. Furthermore, it showed good agreement with the experimental performance data measured at the NASA Ames Research Center wind tunnel during the National Renewable Energy Laboratory 10m Wind Turbine Testing campaign

See also 
 Wind energy software
 Blade element theory
 Momentum theory
 XFOIL
 Lifting Line Theory

References

Further reading

External links 

 QBlade Website
 Software Download
 Users Forum
 Documentation
 Chair of Fluid Dynamics at the TU Berlin

Wind turbines
Aerodynamics
Engineering software that uses Qt
Computer-aided engineering software for Linux